The 2017–18 Metro Atlantic Athletic Conference (MAAC) men's basketball season began with practices in October 2017, followed by the start of the 2017–18 NCAA Division I men's basketball season on November 10. Conference play started in January and concluded on March 15, 2018. This was the 37th season of MAAC basketball.

On February 25, 2018, the last day of the MAAC regular season, both Rider and Canisius won their final game to claim a share of the MAAC Regular Season title. Rider and Canisius both split their regular season games, but Rider had a 1–0 record against third place Niagara and Canisius went 1–1, so Rider was awarded the No. 1 seed in the 2018 MAAC tournament, while Canisius secured the No. 2 seed.

The 2018 MAAC Tournament was held from March 1–5, 2018 at the Times Union Center in Albany, NY. No. 4 seed Iona defeated No. 6 seed Fairfield 83–71 to win the tournament championship, their third consecutive. They joined former member La Salle University (1988–90) and Siena College (2008–10) as the only teams to ever win three consecutive tournament championships. No team has won four consecutive as of 2018. As a result, Iona received the conference's automatic bid to the NCAA tournament. They earned a No. 15 seed and lost to No. 2 seed Duke 67–89 in the first round. Rider, a conference champion who failed to win its conference's tournament, received a bid to the National Invitation Tournament,  losing 86–99 at Oregon. Canisius was invited to play in the College Basketball Invitational, and lost at home to Jacksonville State 78–80OT in the first round. Niagara was invited to the CollegeInsider.com Tournament, and lost at Eastern Michigan 65–83.

Head coaches

Coaching changes 
On March 7, 2017, head coach Tom Moore was fired. He finished at Quinnipiac with a ten-year record of 162–146. On March 27, Villanova assistant coach Baker Dunleavy was hired as the Bobcats next head coach.

Coaches 

Notes: 
 All records, appearances, titles, etc. are from time with current school only. 
 Year at school includes 2017–18 season.
 Overall and MAAC records are from time at current school and are before the beginning of the season.
 Previous jobs are head coaching jobs unless otherwise noted.

Preseason

Preseason Coaches Poll

() first place votes

Preseason All-MAAC teams

† denotes unanimous selection

Preseason Player of the Year

MAAC regular season

Conference matrix
This table summarizes the final head-to-head results between teams in conference play.

Player of the week
Throughout the regular season, the Metro Atlantic Athletic Conference offices named player(s) of the week and rookie(s) of the week.

Records against other conferences
2017–18 records against non-conference foes. Records shown for regular season only.

Postseason

MAAC Tournament

 2018 Metro Atlantic Athletic Conference Basketball Tournament, Times Union Center, Albany, New York

* denotes number of overtimes

NCAA Tournament 

 Game summary

National Invitation Tournament 

 Game summary

College Basketball Invitational 

 Game summary

CollegeInsider.com Tournament 

 Game summary

Honors and awards

MAAC Awards

† denotes unanimous selection

References

External links
MAAC website